The 1962 Connecticut gubernatorial election was held on November 6, 1962. Incumbent Democrat John N. Dempsey defeated Republican nominee John deKoven Alsop with 53.21% of the vote.

General election

Candidates
John N. Dempsey, Democratic
John deKoven Alsop, Republican

Results

References

1962
Connecticut
Gubernatorial